Kelly Fields is an American chef based in New Orleans.

Career 
She is the owner of a bakery/restaurant named after her grandmother, Willa Jean, which is located in New Orleans. Before Fields opened up her restaurant, Willa Jean, she worked for celebrity chef, John Besh. Kelly fields told The Tennessean in an interview that one of her goals in opening Willa Jean was to create a safe and welcoming workplace environment, something she states she did not get in her earlier years. In her restaurant now, there is a ratio of 9:1 female/male staff.

Published works 
She is the author of The Good Book of Southern Baking, published in 2020.

Reception 
Fields has received recognition from Bon Appetit, The New York Times Book Review, and The LA Times, regarding her newly published cookbook as "one of the best cookbooks of the year".

Recognition 
Fields was named "Chef of the Year" by Eater New Orleans. She received the James Beard Award for Outstanding Pastry Chef in 2019.

References 

Wikipedia Student Program
Living people
Year of birth missing (living people)
Chefs from Ohio
Chefs from New Orleans
American food writers
James Beard Foundation Award winners
American women chefs
Pastry chefs